Jangalwar is a village and panchayat in the Thathri tehsil of Doda district in the Jammu division of Jammu and Kashmir, India.

Etymology
The word Jangalwar derives from the Urdu word "Jangal", which means forest, and the village is surrounded by forest.

Location
Jangalwar is situated around 7 kilometres from Thathri and 36 kilometres from the district headquarters of Doda.

References

Doda district
Villages in Doda district